"They Don't Know" is a song written by Kurt Allison, Jaron Boyer, and Josh Mirenda and recorded by American country music artist Jason Aldean. It was released in May 2017 as the fourth and final single — and title track — from Aldean's 2016 album of the same name. The song was a Top 10 hit on both the US Billboard Country Airplay and Hot Country Songs charts with peaks at numbers 3 and 8 respectively.

Music video
The music video was directed by Stephen Shepherd and premiered on CMT, GAC and Vevo in May 2017.

Charts

Year-end charts

References

2016 songs
2017 singles
Jason Aldean songs
BBR Music Group singles
Song recordings produced by Michael Knox (record producer)
Songs written by Jaron Boyer